Khur or Khowr or Khaur or Khvor may refer to the following locations in Iran:
 Khur, Karaj, a village in Karaj County, Alborz Province, Iran
 Khur, Savojbolagh, a village in Savojbolagh County, Alborz Province, Iran
 Khvor-e Shahabi, a village in Bushehr Province, Iran
 Khur, East Azerbaijan, a village in East Azerbaijan Province, Iran
 Khur, Fars, a city in Fars Province, Iran
 Khur, Farashband, a village in Fars Province, Iran
 Khvor-e Khiari, a village in Hormozgan Province, Iran
 Khur-e Mollu, a village in Hormozgan Province, Iran
 Khur, Isfahan, a city in Isfahan Province, Iran
 Khowr, Kerman, a village in Kerman Province, Iran
 Khur, Razavi Khorasan, a village in Razavi Khorasan Province, Iran
 Khvor-e Olya, a village in Razavi Khorasan Province, Iran
 Khvor-e Sofla, a village in Razavi Khorasan Province, Iran
 Khvor-e Vosta, a village in Razavi Khorasan Province, Iran
 Khvor, South Khorasan, a village in South Khorasan Province, Iran
 Khowr, South Khorasan, a village in South Khorasan Province, Iran